Saunder's vlei rat (Otomys saundersiae) is a species of rodent in the family Muridae.
It is found only in South Africa.
Its natural habitats are subtropical or tropical dry shrubland, Mediterranean-type shrubby vegetation, and subtropical or tropical high-altitude grassland.

References

Otomys
Mammals described in 1929
Taxonomy articles created by Polbot
Taxobox binomials not recognized by IUCN